Oricia phryganeata is a moth of the family Notodontidae.

References

Moths described in 1907
Notodontidae of South America